Viscount of Santana was a noble title created by decree on 16 August 1870, by King Luís I, in favor of Manuel Alves Guerra, 1st Baron of Santana.

The title was named for the Palacete of Santana, a grand property situated in the flanks of the urban centre of Horta, then held by the first Baron. Today this manor is occupied by the professional school of the Santa Casa da Misericórdia of Horta (but at one time was the residence of the Civil Governor of the District of Horta.

List of viscounts
 Manuel Alves Guerra, 1st Baron and Viscount of Santana;
 Manuel Alves Guerra, paternal nephew of the first viscount; 
 Manuel de Melsbroeck Alves Guerra, 3rd Viscount of Santana, and son of the former Viscount.

Santana
Azorean nobility
1870 establishments in Portugal